HMAS Madang (P 94), named for the settlement of Madang in New Guinea, was an  of the Royal Australian Navy (RAN). Completed in 1968, the vessel was one of five assigned to the RAN's Papua New Guinea (PNG) Division. The patrol boat was transferred to the Papua New Guinea Defence Force in 1974 as HMPNGS Madang. She was decommissioned in 1989.

Design and construction

The Attack class was ordered in 1964 to operate in Australian waters as patrol boats (based on lessons learned through using the s on patrols of Borneo during the Indonesia-Malaysia Confrontation), and to replace a variety of old patrol, search-and-rescue, and general-purpose craft. Initially, fourteen were ordered for the RAN, five of which were intended for the Papua New Guinea Division of the RAN, although another six ships were ordered to bring the class to twenty vessels.

Propulsion machinery consisted of two 16-cylinder Paxman YJCM diesel engines, which supplied  to the two propellers. The ship's company consisted of three officers and sixteen sailors. Main armament was a bow-mounted Bofors 40 mm gun, supplemented by two .50-calibre M2 Browning machine guns and various small arms. The ships were designed with as many commercial components as possible: the Attacks were to operate in remote regions of Australia and New Guinea, and a town's hardware store would be more accessible than home base in a mechanical emergency.

Madang was built by Evans Deakin at Brisbane, Queensland, launched on 10 August 1968, and commissioned on 28 November 1968.

Operational history
Madang arrived in Port Moresby in March 1969, the last of the five Attack-class boats to be delivered to the PNG Division. Her home port was the RAN base  at Los Negros Island, Manus Province. Primary roles of the new patrol boats were fisheries protection and sea training, but also undertook search and rescue, medical evacuation and monitoring of navigational aids roles. The ship's company was made up of both Australian and PNG servicemen. Prior to the arrival of the Attack-class patrol boats, surveillance of PNG waters was conducted by small coastal craft and occasional visits by larger RAN warships, but the PNG Division was now able to chase and apprehend vessels suspected of illegal fishing.

Madang was one of the five Attack-class patrol boats of the PNG Division transferred to the Papua New Guinea Defence Force's (PNGDF) Maritime Element (now Maritime Operations Element) on 14 November 1974 when the PNGDF took over maritime functions. They formed the PNGDF Patrol Boat Squadron based at Manus. Madang was decommissioned in 1989.

Citations

References

Attack-class patrol boats
Ships built in Queensland
1968 ships